Woo Bum-kon (or Wou Bom-kon, February 24, 1955 – April 27, 1982) was a South Korean policeman and spree killer who murdered between 56 and 62 people and wounded 29 others in several villages in Uiryeong County, South Gyeongsang Province, South Korea, during the night from April 26 to April 27, 1982, before committing suicide.

At the time, Woo's rampage was the worst mass shooting in modern history committed by a single perpetrator, and remains the second deadliest, later surpassed only by the 2011 Norway terrorist attacks. It was also the deadliest deliberate single loss of life in South Korean history until the Daegu Subway Inferno in 2003.

Background 
Woo Bum-kon had served in the Republic of Korea Marine Corps, where he was recognized as a skilled marksman until his discharge in 1978. From April 11 until December 30 of 1981, he served as a police officer and, with his marksmanship ability, was able to work as a guard at the Blue House. However, Woo's excessive drinking habits and subsequent behavior caused him to be demoted to his position at Kungyu Village in Uiryeong County, South Gyeongsang Province.

Uiryeong massacre

Prelude 
On the afternoon of April 26, 1982, Woo had an argument with his live-in girlfriend, Chun Mal-soon (전말순), after she had woken him by swatting a fly on his chest. Enraged, Woo left the house and went to the police station, where he reported for duty at 4:00 p.m. According to early reports, he began drinking heavily, though eyewitnesses later stated that he did not appear drunk during his rampage. According to local officials, he would have been unable to cover  of difficult, rocky terrain while intoxicated.

At about 7:30 p.m., Woo returned home, assaulted his girlfriend and smashed their furniture before making his way to the reservists' armory and gathering several weapons, consisting of two M2 carbines, two handguns, At least 180 rounds of ammunition, and seven hand grenades. Some reports stated that the other officers were at a meeting, and he therefore managed to grab the weapons unnoticed, though others mentioned that he had intimidated the guards to gain access.

Victims

Togok-ri (토곡리)
Jeon Un-suk (전은숙), 23
Son Jin-tae (손진태), 26

Apgok-ri (압곡리)
Gang Pan-im (강판임), 61
Choi Bun-ee (최분이), 71
Jeon Jong-jeong (전종정), 36
Baek Jeom-ag (백점악), 36, wife of Jeon Jong-jeong
Lee Chun-su (이춘수), 50
Son Jeong-hee (손정희), 50
Yu Baek-am (유백암), 59
Lee Pan-su (이판수), 50
Mun Sun-ee (문순이), 44, wife of Lee Pan-su

Ungye-ri (운계리)
Son Won-jeom (손원점), 51
Shin Su-jeong (신수정), 9, daughter of Shin We-do
Shin Chang-sun (신창순), 13, daughter of Shin We-do
Park In-gil (박인길), 42
Choi Jeong-nyeo (최정녀), 40, wife of Park In-gil
Park Kyung-suk (박경숙), 19, son of Park In-gil
Park Jae-cheol (박재철), 14, son of Park In-gil
Park Hyeon-suk (박현숙), 8, daughter of Park In-gil
Seol Sun-jeom (설순점), 49
Yu Sun-ja (유순자), 19, daughter of Seol Sun-jeom
Kim Wol-sun (김월순), 28
Jeon Dal-bae (전달배), 18
Sin Yeong-lyeon (신경련), 43
Yu Jeom-sun (유점순), 19
Jin Pil-li (진필리), 19
Jeon Yong-gil (전용길), 37
Kim Ju-dong (김주동), 18
Jin Il-im (진일임), 48
Park Gab-jeo (박갑저), 38
Park Myeong-lyeon (박명련), 32
Park Mi-hae (박미해), 14

Pyongchon-ni (평촌리)
Seo Hyeong-su (서형수), 27
Seo Jeong-su (서정수), 22, brother of Seo Hyeong-su
Park Jong-deog (박종덕), 43
Jeon Bok-sun (전복순), 63
Park Bong-sun (박봉순), 41
Ham So-nam (함소남), 51
Lee Ta-sun (이타순), 46
Lee Sun-du (이순두), 46
Han Myeong-gyu (한명규), 53
Choi Gyeong-jag (최경작), 43
Seo Eum-seog (서음석), 20, son of Choi Gyeong-jag
Mun Byeong-hyeong (문병형), 8
Mun Se-jeong (문세정), 2
Gwak Gi-dal (곽기달), 43
Gwak Ju-il (곽주일), 14, son of Gwak Gi-dal
Park Sun-deog (박순덕), 41, wife of Gwak Gi-dal
Jo Eul-sun (조을순), 56

Other areas
Heo Ee-jung (허이중), 23, killed in Byeokgye-ri (벽계리)
Jo Gwi-nam (조귀남), 54, killed in Jukjeon-ri (죽전리)
Jo Myeong-lyul (조명률), 59, killed in Bonggok-ri (봉곡리)
Ha Gyeong-jae (하경재), 5
Yu Lyang (유량), age unknown
Jo Yong-deog (조용덕), 46, Haman-gun

Perpetrator (suicide)
 Woo Bum-kon (우범곤), 27

Rampage begins 
At approximately 9:30 p.m., Woo shot his first victim and entered the local post office, where he killed three phone operators and cut off the telephone lines. He next went to Torongni, where he threw a grenade and shot at passers-by in the marketplace, killing six people. He also wounded Chun Mal-soon, who had gone to investigate after hearing shots in the village. From that point on, he proceeded from village to village, taking advantage of his position as a police officer to gain entry to the houses and shoot their inhabitants.

At 10:30 p.m., Woo took 18-year-old Kim Ju-dong (김주동) hostage and moved to Ungye-Ri (운계리), where he ordered Kim to get him a soft drink from a grocery store owned by 52-year-old Shin We-do (신외도). After getting what he had asked for, Woo killed Kim and then attacked the store owner and his family. Shin We-do managed to escape after being shot in the leg, though his wife Son Won-jeom (손원점) and his daughters Chang-sun (창순) and Su-jeong (수정) were killed. Woo continued his shooting at the market-place, killing a total of 18 people in that village, before making his way towards Pyongchon-Ni (평촌리).

At Pyongchon-Ni, he shot a family of four in their beds and then went to a house, where a wake was in progress. When the owner of the house saw the armed policeman and asked what had happened, Woo explained that there was an alert as North Korean agents had been spotted. The man invited Woo into the house for dinner, during which the latter complained about his small salary and his transfer from Pusan to the countryside. Woo eventually began shooting at the guests after one of them had remarked that his ammunition did not look real. He killed twelve people in the house and a further eight in the streets, thus leaving a total of 24 people dead in Pyongchon-ni.

Police response, suspect's death 
Although police were alerted within minutes of the first shots being fired, it took them an hour to gather a team of 37 officers to search for the gunman, and the national police headquarters in Seoul were not informed until 1:40 a.m. Around that time, just 4 km (2.5 mi) from the police station in Kungryu, Woo found refuge in a farmhouse belonging to 68-year-old Suh In-Su (서인수), whom he told that he was chasing a Communist infiltrator, and that the family should gather in the main room of the house so he could protect them. When the family gathered at his request, he held them hostage.

Two hours later, police eventually caught up with him, and as forces closed in, Woo strapped two grenades to his chest and detonated them, killing himself and three of his hostages. Suh himself survived gravely injured. Four rounds of ammunition and one hand grenade were recovered by police from inside the farmhouse.

Immediate aftermath 
When the rampage finally ended, 55 people and Woo himself were dead, while 36 others were wounded, six of them fatally. One of the mortally wounded, a child who had been shot, died on May 8. At that time, 35 people were still being treated in hospitals in Jinju and Masan.

Chun Mal-soon later said that her boyfriend "suffered from an inferiority complex and had been bothered by villagers' comments on their living together unmarried". Later on, the provincial chief of police was suspended and four other officers were arrested for negligence of duty.

Aftermath 
The Interior Minister of South Korea, Suh Chung-hwa, and the national police chief, A Eung-mo, offered to resign as a form of atonement for Woo's rampage. Suh Chung-hwa, being held responsible for the incident by president Chun Doo-hwan, resigned his commission on April 29, and Roh Tae-woo was appointed Interior Minister.

A special parliamentary team was formed, consisting of 19 parliamentarians and led by Home Affairs Committee chairman Kim Chong-hoh, to investigate the massacre and its disastrous handling by the police. Furthermore, the South Korean Cabinet decided to pay compensations to the victims and their families.

See also 

List of rampage killers
List of man-made disasters in South Korea

References

Further reading
 "Korean policeman goes berserk, kills 58 people", The Deseret News (April 27, 1982), p. 1
 "Korean cop's rampage leaves 58 dead", Ocala Star-Banner (April 27, 1982)
 "Korean policeman's rampage kills 58", Boca Raton News (April 27, 1982)
 "Berserk Korean policeman kills 62", Gainesville Sun (April 27, 1982)
 "Drunken South Korean policeman kills 62", The Ledger (April 27, 1982)
 "Berserk cop kills 53", Ellensburg Daily Record (April 27, 1982)
 "Korean cop massacres 58", Eugene Register-Guard (April 27, 1982)
 "Funerals begin for 57 victims of massacre by Korean cop", Ocala Star-Banner (April 28, 1982)
 "Korean massacre area flooded with donations", Eugene Register-Guard (April 28, 1982)
 "Korean's shooting rampage triggered by swat of a fly", St. Petersburg Times (April 28, 1982), Florida
 "Death toll in rampage put at 62", The Age (April 28, 1982)
 "Drunken Korean kills 58", The Free-Lance Star (April 27, 1982)
 "28명 죽이고 초상집 문상… 부의금 3000원 낸 뒤 또 난사", The Hankyoreh (April 13, 2012)

1955 births
1982 suicides
South Korean mass murderers
South Korean spree killers
South Korean murderers of children
Suicide bombers
Murder–suicides in South Korea
Mass murder in 1982
South Korean police officers
Republic of Korea Marine Corps personnel
Danyang U clan
People from Busan
People from South Gyeongsang Province
Suicides by explosive device in South Korea
Spree shootings in South Korea
Mass shootings in South Korea
Mass murder in South Korea